Miss Universe 1967, the 16th Miss Universe pageant, was held on 15 July 1967 at the Miami Beach Auditorium in Miami Beach, Florida, United States. Sylvia Hitchcock of United States was crowned by Margareta Arvidsson of Sweden at the end of the event, This was Bob Barker's first Miss Universe pageant as host.

Results

Placements

Contestants

  - Amalia Yolanda Scuffi
  - Ivonne Maduro
  - Christl Bartu
  - Elizabeth Knowles
  - Mauricette Sironval
  - Cheryl Michele Smith
  - Marcela Montoya García
  - Cristina Landwier
  - Carmen Silva De Barros Ramasco
  - Donna Marie Barker
  - Ingrid Vila Riveros
  - Elsa María Garrido Cajiao
  - Rosa María Fernández
  - Elina Salavarría
  - Imelda Thodé
  - Gitte Rhein Knudsen
  - Jeannette Rey García
  - Jennifer Lynn Lewis
  - Ritva Helena Lehto †
  - Anne Vernier
  - Fee Von Zitzewitz
  - Elia Kalogeraki
  - Hope Marie Navarro Alvarez
  - Irene Van Campenhout
  - Denia María Alvorado Medina
  - Laura Arminda Da Costa Roque
  - Guðrún Pétursdóttir
  - Nayyara Mirza
  - Patricia Armstrong
  - Batia Kabiri
  - Paola Rossi
  - Kayoko Fujikawa
  - Hong Jung-ae
  - Marie-Jossee Mathgen
  - Monkam Anne Lowe Siprasome
  - Valentina Vales Duarte
  - Pamela McLeod
  - Gro Goskor
  - Etsuko Okuhira
  - Mirna Norma Castillero
  - María Eugenia Torres
  - Mirtha Calvo Sommaruga
  - Pilar Delilah Veloso Pilapil
  - Yvonne Coll
  - Lena MacGarvie
  - Bridget Ong Mei-Lee
  - Windley Ballenden
  - Francisca Delgado Sánchez
  - Eva-Lisa Svensson
  - Elsbeth Ruegger
  - Ayse Yelda Gurani
  - Mayela Berton Martínez
  - Sylvia Louise Hitchcock †
  - Mariela Pérez Branger
  - Gail Garrison
  - Denise Elizabeth Page

Notes
Miss Ecuador and Miss Thailand were disqualified upon arrival because they were only 17 years old and sent back to their countries,Herbert Landon, Executive Director of the contest, whose president at that time was Harold Glasser, said that the contestants must have a minimum 18 years and a maximum of 28 by the date of the final.

Withdrawals
  - Seedevi de Zoysas Tewaitta Ragama 
  – Laura Baquero Palacios was underage before February 1.
  - Bone Jay
  - Elham Warwar
 
 
 
  - Prapassorn Panichakula was underage before February 1.

Did Not Compete
  - Maria Porras Rottman

Awards
  - Miss Amity (Lena MacGarvie)
  - Miss Photogenic (Elia Kalogeraki)
  - Best National Costume (Carmen Ramasco)

General References

References

1967
1967 in Florida
1967 beauty pageants
Beauty pageants in the United States
Events in Miami Beach, Florida
July 1967 events in the United States